South Glens Falls is a village in Saratoga County, New York, United States. The population was 3,518 at the 2010 census. The village is in the northern part of the Town of Moreau, south of the City of Glens Falls.

Cooper's Cave, shown on the village seal, is named after the author, James Fenimore Cooper. Cooper was inspired to use the area as a location in his novel, The Last of The Mohicans, after visiting the area.

History 
In the late Woodland period, the area was considered to be the winter hunting grounds for the Mohawk and Algonquian tribes. Slowly, the area became attractive to settlement as good were transported through the "Great Carry" (now Route 9), between Glens Falls and Fort Edward.

In 1766, the Daniel Parks family was the first family to settle into the area after receiving  of land, on which they built a house and a saw mill. By the mid-1830s, the settlement boasted saw mills, a grist mill, a cotton mill and a quarry as well as a dock to facilitate commerce.

The Village was formally incorporated in 1895 as a result of an effort to form a public water system.

The Historical Society of Moreau and South Glens Falls is housed in the Parks-Bentley House, added to the National Register of Historic Places in 1994.

Education
South Glens Falls Central School District (SGFCSD) is registered by the New York State Department of Education and was chartered by the New York State Board of Regents in 1945. It consists of four elementary schools (grades K-5), one middle school (grades 6-8) and one high school (grades 9-12). Total enrollment in the district is 3,350 students. Student-to-teacher ratio currently stands at 15:1, with more than half of the teaching staff having 20 years of classroom experience. Total per pupil costs are among the lowest in Saratoga County and is governed by a nine-member Board of Education.

Elementary schools 
 Ballard Elementary School
 Harrison Avenue Elementary School
 Moreau Elementary School
 Tanglewood Elementary School

Middle school 
 Oliver W. Winch Middle School·

High school 
 South Glens Falls Senior High School (located at 42 Merritt Road, South Glens Falls, NY 12803)
South Glens Falls Central School District Website

South Glens Falls Senior High School, locally known as South High, is the host of the annual South High Marathon Dance, where high school students raise money for families, individuals, or causes identified as in need. The inaugural event, in 1978, raised about $1500 for the local Emergency Squad. As of 2016, the Marathon Dance had raised a cumulative total of over $5.5 million for various causes, individuals, and families.

Law and government
The Village is served by the South Glens Falls Police Department.

The Village is governed by a Mayor and a four-person Village Board.

Geography
South Glens Falls is located at  (43.296406, -73.634296).

The village is located on the south bank of the Hudson River and is off exit 17N of Interstate 87.

U.S. Route 9, New York State Route 32 and County Road 28, all north-south highways, converge in the village.

Demographics

As of the census of 2000, there were 3,368 people, 1,523 households, and 851 families residing in the village. The population density was 2,500.6 people per square mile (963.3/km2). There were 1,616 housing units at an average density of 1,199.8 per square mile (462.2/km2). The racial makeup of the village was 98.52% White, 0.68% African American, 0.09% Native American, 0.15% Asian, 0.12% from other races, and 0.45% from two or more races. Hispanic or Latino of any race were 0.62% of the population.

There were 1,523 households, out of which 25.0% had children under the age of 18 living with them, 40.9% were married couples living together, 12.1% had a female householder with no husband present, and 44.1% were non-families. 36.6% of all households were made up of individuals, and 17.3% had someone living alone who was 65 years of age or older. The average household size was 2.20 and the average family size was 2.90.

In the village, the population was spread out, with 21.7% under the age of 18, 8.3% from 18 to 24, 30.5% from 25 to 44, 21.8% from 45 to 64, and 17.7% who were 65 years of age or older. The median age was 38 years. For every 100 females, there were 87.3 males. For every 100 females age 18 and over, there were 85.2 males.

The median income for a household in the village was $31,623, and the median income for a family was $41,694. Males had a median income of $31,757 versus $24,046 for females. The per capita income for the village was $17,260. About 8.3% of families and 10.6% of the population were below the poverty line, including 10.9% of those under age 18 and 13.0% of those age 65 or over.

References

External links
 Village of South Glens Falls

Villages in New York (state)
New York (state) populated places on the Hudson River
Villages in Saratoga County, New York